Atheism: The Case Against God is a 1974 book by George H. Smith, in which the author argues against theism and for atheism.

Summary
Smith describes the purpose of the book as to show that belief in God is irrational:

Reception
The philosopher Michael Martin published a review in April 1982, stating that the book was "a hard hitting attack against belief" with "some limitations".

See also
 The God Delusion

References

External links
 Michael Martin's review of "Atheism: The Case Against God"
 Margaret Placentra Johnston's review of "Atheism: The Case Against God"

1974 non-fiction books
Books about atheism
Books critical of religion
Contemporary philosophical literature
English-language books